The Essential Tagore is the largest collection of Rabindranath Tagore's works available in English. It was published by Harvard University Press in the United States and Visva-Bharati University in India to mark the 150th anniversary of Tagore's birth. Fakrul Alam and Radha Chakrabarthy edited the anthology. Among the notable contributors who translated Tagore's works for this anthology are Amitav Ghosh, Amit Chaudhuri, Sunetra Gupta, Syed Manzoorul Islam, and Kaiser Haq. Martha Nussbaum, a philosopher, writer and critic proposed the book as the 'Book of the Year' in the New Statesman published on November 21, 2011.

The anthology is around eight hundred pages long, divided into ten sections, each devoted to a different facet of Tagore's achievement. In this anthology, the editors endeavored to represent his extraordinary achievements in ten genres: poetry, songs, autobiographical works, letters, travel writings, prose, novels, short stories, humorous pieces, and plays. Most of the translations were done in modern contemporary English. Besides the new translations, it includes a sampling of works originally composed in English, Tagore's translations of his own works.

Critical reception

Initial reviews for the Essential Tagore were almost all positive. Immediately after the publication, it received positive reviews worldwide. Barry Hill in the Australian welcomed the publication as "a wonderful job" and "almost all gold". Praising the editors and translators, Amartya Sen exclaimed that though the excellence of Tagore's work is difficult to preserve in translation, they did a splendid job of producing a beautiful volume of selections from Tagore's vast body of writings. He also praised Amit Chaudhuri for his enjoyable and remarkably far-reaching foreword. In Times Literary Supplement Seamus Perry wrote that the anthology testifies to Tagore's capability in many diverse modes, and quite distinct aspects of his genius. In the magazine Bookforum, Aravind Adiga opined that the anthology reintroduced a great writer to the world. Amardeep Singh of Open Letters Monthly thought that the Essential Tagore "dwarfes(ed) all previous efforts" that were made to translate Tagore's work into English.

Contents of the book

 List of Illustrations
 Foreword: Poetry as Polemic by Amit Chaudhuri
 Introduction

1. Autobiography
Autobiographical
From Reminiscences
From Boyhood Days
My School

2. Letters
From Torn Leaves
From Letter-Fragments
To Mrinalini Devi
To Jagadish Chandra Bose
To Myron H. Phelps
To William Rothenstein
To Robert Bridges
To James Drummonds Anderson
To Lord Chelmsford
To Charles Freer Andrews
To Kanti Chandra Ghosh
To Edward John Thompson
To Kazi Nazrul Islam
To Romain Rolland
To Sir William Rothenstein
To Mahatma Gandhi
To Mahadev Desai
To Sufia Kamal
To Pulinbehari Sen
To Victoria Ocampo
To Revd. Foss Westcott

3. Prose
From Self-Reliance and Other Essays
Statecraft and Ethics
The Components of Literature
The Significance of Literature
The Problem of Self
Nationalism in the West
The Nobel Prize Acceptance Speech
From Thoughts from Rabindranath Tagore
My Pictures
 Hindus and Muslims
The Tenant Farmer 
 Crisis in Civilization

4. Poems
The Fountain's Awakening
Enough, Enough!
Life
Undressed
Breasts
Kissing
The Golden Boat
The Two Birds
I Won't Let You Go
Unfathomable
Voyage without End
To Civilization
My Little Plot of Land
A Hundred Years from Now
The Lord of Life
Love Queries
Krishnakali
The Poet
The Hero
Big and Small
Astronomy
On the Day Thou Breakst Through This My Name
More Life, My Lord
Thy Rod of Justice
The Day I Depart
It Hasn't Rained in My Heart
When Life Dries Up
If the Day Ends
This Stormy Night
A Flight of Geese
The Restless One
Dawn and Dusk
Free!
Sunday
Hymn to the Tree
Woman Empowered
Wind Instrument
Letter Writing
An Ordinary Woman
Camellia
The Twenty-Fifth of Baisakh
I
Africa
I Saw in the Twilight
Romantic
The Night Train
Waking Up in the Morning I See
They Work
 On the Banks of Roop-Naran
The Sun of the First Day
Dark Nights of Sorrow
On the Way to Creation

5. Songs
Devotional Songs
Patriotic Songs
Love Songs
Songs of Nature
Miscellaneous Songs

6. Plays
Roktokorobi
The Kingdom of Cards

7. Stories
The Return of Khoka Babu
The Legacy
Shubha
Mahamaya
The In-Between Woman
Hungry Stone
A Broken Nest
The Wife's Letter
The Final Word
The Tale of a Muslim Woman

8. Novels
From Gora
From Connections
From Farewell Song
From Four Chapters

9. Humor
Denge the Black Ant's Observations
Aryans and Non-Aryans
The Funeral
Ordeal
Testing the Student
The Invention of Shoes
From Out of Sync

10. Travel Writing
The City of Bombay
Crossing the Ocean
Travel
Stopford Brooke
The English Village and the Clergy
From Journey to Japan
Letter to Pratima Devi
From Letters from Russia
From In Persia
 Chronology
 Notes
 Glossary
 Further Reading
 Acknowledgments
 Contributors

References

Works by Rabindranath Tagore
2011 books
Translations into English